Mantra Recordings was a subsidiary of Beggars Banquet Records.

Artists
China Drum
The Delgados
Dot Allison
Gorky's Zygotic Mynci
Muki
Natacha Atlas
Parva
Saint Etienne
Six by Seven
Pure Essence

See also 
 List of record labels

External links
 Official site
 

British independent record labels
Defunct record labels of the United Kingdom
Beggars Group